Nova União may refer to:

 Nova União, Minas Gerais, municipality in Brazil
 Nova União, Rondônia, municipality in Brazil
 Nova União (mixed martial arts), Brazilian jiu-jitsu and mixed martial arts team